Piedmont Avenue may refer to:
Piedmont Avenue (Oakland, California), a neighborhood and street
Piedmont Avenue (Berkeley), a historic street
Piedmont Avenue and Piedmont Road, a major thoroughfare in Atlanta